Jerome David Marotta (born February 6, 1956, in Cleveland, Ohio) is an American drummer who resides in Woodstock, New York. He is the younger brother of Rick Marotta, who is also a drummer and composer.

Career
Marotta was a member of the bands Arthur, Hurley & Gottlieb (1973–75), Orleans (1976–77 & 1982), Peter Gabriel's band (1977–86), Hall & Oates (1979–81), the Indigo Girls' touring band (1992–97), Stackridge (2011), Sevendys (2010–present) and The Tony Levin Band (1995 to 2017). He has also played with Phil Keaggy and Tony Levin. 

Marotta also played drums on Stevie Nicks and Mike Campbell's song "Whole Lotta Trouble" from Nicks' 1989 album The Other Side of the Mirror. He has also performed on albums by Ani DiFranco, Sarah McLachlan, Marshall Crenshaw, The Dream Academy, Pino Daniele, Suzanne Vega, Carlene Carter, John Mayer, Iggy Pop, Tears for Fears, Elvis Costello, Cher, Paul McCartney, Carly Simon, Lawrence Gowan, Ron Sexsmith, Banda do Casaco, Joan Armatrading and many others. Other notable musicians he has played with on various projects are Eric Johnson, Todd Rundgren and Phil Keaggy. 

In addition to his work as a studio and stage drummer, he is a singer, composer and record producer. In 1996 he produced Ellis Paul's A Carnival of Voices. He is currently touring with The Security Project. Marotta currently lives in Woodstock, New York with his wife where he manages Dreamland Recording Studios.

Discography

With Orleans
 Waking and Dreaming
 Orleans (1980 album)
 One of a Kind
 We're Still Having Fun: The Best of Orleans

With Peter Gabriel
 Peter Gabriel 2 (Scratch)
 Peter Gabriel 3 (Melt)
 Peter Gabriel 4 (Security)
 Plays Live
 Birdy
 So
 Shaking the Tree: Sixteen Golden Greats

With Hall and Oates
 X-Static
 Voices
 Private Eyes
 Ecstasy on the Edge

With Indigo Girls
 Nomads Indians Saints
 Rites of Passage
 Swamp Ophelia
 1200 Curfews
 Shaming of the Sun
 Come on Now Social
 The Best Of
 Retrospective

With Tony Levin
 World Diary
 From the Caves of the Iron Mountain (with Steve Gorn)
 Waters of Eden
 Pieces of the Sun
 Double Espresso
 Resonator

With Stevie Nicks
 The Other Side of the Mirror
 Timespace: The Best of Stevie Nicks
 The Enchanted Works of Stevie Nicks

With others
 Banda do Casaco "Também Eu" 1982
 Banda do Casaco No Jardim da Celeste 1980
 Gaye Adegbalola Bitter Sweet Blues 1999
 Leon Alvarado with Trey Gunn 2014 Music from an Expanded Universe 2014
 Amy & Leslie Take Me Home 1994
 Joan Armatrading Walk Under Ladders 1981
 Joan Armatrading The Key 1983
 Joy Askew Tender City 1996
 Lou Ann Barton Forbidden Tones 1986
 Pino Daniele Bonne soirée 1987
 Jimmy Barnes Freight Train Heart 1987
 Jenny Bird Into Stars 2000
 Mary Black Shine 1997
 Rory Block Mama's Blues 1992
 Rory Block Ain't I a Woman 1992
 Rory Block Angel of Mercy 1994
 Rory Block Tornado 1996
 Rory Block Confessions of a Blues Singer 1996
 Michael Franks Time Together 2011
 The Blue Airplanes Beatsongs 1991
 Chris Botti First Wish 1995
 Chris Botti Midnight Without You 1997
 Chris Botti Slowing Down the World 1999
 David Bradstreet David Bradstreet 1976
 Cindy Bullens Desire Wire 1978
 Sheryl Crow The Globe Sessions 1998
 T-Bone Burnett Proof Through the Night 1983
 Carlene Carter Two Sides to Every Woman 1979
 Peter Case Peter Case   1986
 Beth Nielsen Chapman Look 2005
 Cher Cher 1987 
 Marc Cohn Marc Cohn  1991  
 Elvis Costello Spike 1989
 Marshall Crenshaw Downtown 1985
 Paul D'Adamo Rawfully Organic 2015
 Jim Dawson Elephants in the Rain 1975
 Ani DiFranco Little Plastic Castle 1998
 The Dream Academy Remembrance Days 1987
 Robbie Dupree Carried Away 1987
 Robbie Dupree Walking on Water 1993
 Cliff Eberheart Now You Are My Home 1993
 Linda Eder It's Time 1997
 Linda Eder Broadway My Way 2003
 The Explorers The Explorers 1983
 The Explorers Crack the Whip 1985
 The Explorers Up in Smoke 1989
 Ferron Phantom Center 1995
 Holly Figueroa How It Is 2002
 Bruce Foster After the Show 1977
 Free Beer Highway Robbery 1976
 Sarah Fimm White Birds 2008
 Sarah Fimm Red Yellow Sun 2009
 Tim Finn Tim Finn 1989
 The Fragile Fate Lilliam Ocean 2015
 Robert Fripp Exposure 1979
 Mitchell Froom Dopamine 1998
 Bill Gable There Were Signs 1989
 Lisa Germano Slide 1998
 Pamela Golden Happens All the Time 1991
 Lawrence Gowan Strange Animal 1985
 Lawrence Gowan Lost Brotherhood 1990 
 Gowan But You Can Call Me Larry 1993
 Grey Eye Glances A Little Voodoo 2001
 Nanci Griffith Flyer 1994
 Kristen Hall Be Careful What You Wish For 1994
 The Hellboys Cha Cha with the Hellboys 2004
 Sarah Hickman Necessary Angels 1994
 Courtney Jaye Traveling Light 2005
 Eric Johnson Tones 1986
 Barbara Kessler Notion 1996
 RK: Roman Klun Kingsway 2008
 The Korgis Sticky George 1981
 Mark Kostabi The Spectre of Modernism 2011
 Latin Playboys Dose 1999
 Los Lobos The Neighborhood 1990
 Jennifer Maidman Dreamland  2017
 Martha and the Muffins The World is a Ball 1985
 Eric Martin Eric Martin 1985
 Flav Martin & Jerry Marotta Soul Redemption 2018
 John Mayer Room for Squares 2001
 Kate McDonnell Don't Get Me Started 2001
 Kate McDonnell Ballad of a Bad Girl 2021
 Maria McKee Maria Mckee 1989
 Sarah McLachlan Fumbling Towards Ecstasy 1993
 Sarah McLachlan Afterglow 2003
 Pat McLaughlin Pat McLaughlin 1988
 Rhett Miller The Dreamer 2012
 The Murmurs Pristine Smut 1997
 The Murmurs Blender 1998
 Sarah Nagourney Realm of My Senses 1995
 Jeb Loy Nichols Lovers Knot 1997
 Tom Pacheco There Was a Time 2002
 Richard Page Shelter Me 1996
 The Passage Project That Ill Note 2008
 Ellis Paul A Carnival of Voices 1996
 Ellis Paul Translucent Soul 1998 
 Tom Paxton & Anne Hills Under American Skies 2001
 Peter Primamore Grancia 2008
 Phil Keaggy Tony Levin & Jerry Marotta The Bucket List 2019
 Axell Red Un Coeur Comme Le Mien 2011
 Happy Rhodes Building the Colossus 1994
 Happy Rhodes Many Worlds Are Born Tonight 1998
 Steev Richter Beloved 2016
 Leslie Ritter In the Silence 1998
 Leslie Ritter & Scott Petito Circles in the Sand 2001
 Robbie Robertson Storyville 1991
 Diane Scanlon Again 2017
 John Sebastian Tar Beach 1993
 John Sebastian John Sebastian and the J-Band: Chasin' Gus' Ghost 1999
 Security Project Live 1 2016
 Security Project Live 2 2016
 Security Project Five 2017
 Security Project CONTACT 2017
 Security Project Slowburn 2018
 Ron Sexsmith Ron Sexsmith 1995
 Ron Sexsmith Other Songs 1997
 Jules Shear Healing Bones 1994
 Vonda Shepard By 7:30 1999
 Vonda Shepard Chinatown 2002
 Michelle Shocked Arkansas Traveler 1992
 Ellen Shipley Ellen Shipley 1979
 Carly Simon Torch 1981
 Sister Red Sister Red 1991
 Rick Springfield Hard to Hold 1984
 Syd Straw Surprise 1989
 Tasmin Archer Bloom 1996
 Paul McCartney Press to Play 1986
 Sun Palace Give Me a Perfect World 2005  
 David Sylvian and Robert Fripp The First Day 1993
 David Sylvian Everything and Nothing 2000
 Scott Tarulli Anywhere, Anytime 2012
 Tears for Fears Songs from the Big Chair 1985
 10,000 Maniacs Few and Far Between (single) 1993
 10,000 Maniacs MTV Unplugged 1994
 Mia Doi Todd The Golden State 2002
 Artie Traum South of Lafayette 2002   
 Pierce Turner Now Is Heaven 1993
 Bonnie Tyler Hide Your Heart 1988
 Various Artists Tower of Song: The Songs of Leonard Cohen 1995
 Various Artists Spider-Man: Rock Reflections... 1975
 Various Artists Roundup Records CD Sampler 1994
 Various Artists VH1 Storytellers 2001
 Various Artists Boys on the Side 1995
 Various Artists Caught 1996
 Various Artists Dead Man Walking 1996
 Various Artists Practical Magic 1998
 Various Artists Me, Myself & Irene 2000
 Suzanne Vega 99.9F° 1992
 Suzanne Vega Nine Objects of Desire 1996 
 Suzanne Vega Retrospective: The Best of Suzanne Vega 2003
 Suzanne Vega Retrospective: Deluxe Sound and Vision 2004 
 Vitamin Z Rites of Passage 1984
 Robert Burke Warren Lazyeye 2004
 Fee Waybill Read My Lips 1984
 Johnny Warman Walking into Mirrors 1981
 Dan Zanes Cool Down Time 1995
 Dan Zanes Night Time! 2002
 Hector Zazou Chansons des mers froides 1995
 Michael Zenter Playtime 1995
 Diane Zeigler Sting of the Honeybee 1995

References

External links
Jerry Marotta Website

1956 births
Living people
Record producers from Ohio
Musicians from Cleveland
Indigo Girls members
American people of Italian descent
Hall & Oates members
Orleans (band) members
American rock drummers
American session musicians
20th-century American drummers
American male drummers